Nucras scalaris, the scaled sandveld lizard, is a wall lizard in the family of true lizards (Lacertidae). It is endemic to Angola.

References 

Nucras
Lacertid lizards of Africa
Reptiles of Angola
Endemic fauna of Angola
Reptiles described in 1964
Taxa named by Raymond Laurent